Henry Petrie may refer to:

 Henry Petrie (antiquary) (1768–1842), English antiquary
 Henry W. Petrie (1857–1925), American composer and performer